Taylorville is a city in and the county seat of Christian County, Illinois, United States. The population was 10,506 at the 2020 census, making it the county's largest city.

History
Taylorville was founded on  May 24, 1839, and was named after John Taylor, a planning commissioner for the state of Illinois.

Taylorville was known (in the early to mid-1990s) to have had a high rate of neuroblastoma, a cancer affecting the adrenal gland and striking children. The local power company Central Illinois Public Service Company was sued and lost for contaminating the groundwater in 1994.

Some outer homes and a business in Taylorville were damaged by an F1 tornado on April 2, 2006.

On August 11, 2012, a Beechcraft Model 18 airplane crashed into a residential area of Taylorville, killing the pilot but injuring none on the ground. A subsequent NTSB investigation into the accident concluded that an improper flap configuration and failure to maintain the correct airspeed due to pilot error, resulted in the crash.

At about 5:15 PM on December 1, 2018, as part of the December 2018 tornado outbreak, a strong tornado hit Taylorville. The tornado injured at least 26 residents and damaged more than 600 homes and businesses, 34 of which were completely destroyed.

Geography
Taylorville is located at  (39.540768, −89.288005).

Demographics

As of the 2020 census there were 10,506 people, 5,064 households, and 2,507 families residing in the city. The racial makeup of the city was 93.81% White, 0.90% African American, 0.24% Native American, 0.94% Asian, 0.02% Pacific Islander, 0.52% from other races, and 3.56% from two or more races. Hispanic or Latino of any race were 1.65% of the population.

There were 5,064 households, out of which 41.33% had children under the age of 18 living with them, 36.45% were married couples living together, 9.72% had a female householder with no husband present, and 50.49% were non-families. 44.10% of all households were made up of individuals, and 20.22% had someone living alone who was 65 years of age or older. The average household size was 2.96 and the average family size was 2.07.

The city's age distribution consisted of 20.7% under the age of 18, 6.4% from 18 to 24, 26.2% from 25 to 44, 27% from 45 to 64, and 19.7% who were 65 years of age or older. The median age was 42.4 years. For every 100 females, there were 84.8 males. For every 100 females age 18 and over, there were 79.5 males.

The median income for a household in the city was $41,397, and the median income for a family was $63,885. Males had a median income of $42,474 versus $28,466 for females. The per capita income for the city was $26,513. About 9.7% of families and 13.1% of the population were below the poverty line, including 13.5% of those under age 18 and 12.7% of those age 65 or over.

Transportation 
Taylorville is served by Illinois Route 29, Illinois Route 48 and Illinois Route 104. By closest major city, Illinois Route 29 connects Taylorville to Springfield Illinois; Illinois Route 48 connects to Decatur Illinois including, from there, highway access to Pana Illinois via US Highway 51 and to Champaign Illinois via Interstate 72; and Illinois Route 104 connects Taylorville to Jacksonville Illinois.

Education 
The IHSA single season boys' basketball record of 45–0 was set by Taylorville High School in 1944. Ron Bontemps and Johnny Orr were team members.

In 1911, the Taylorville Christians were a member of the Illinois–Missouri League, an American minor league baseball league. Future Baseball Hall of Famer Ray Schalk played on that team.

Media 
The town newspaper is the Breeze-Courier, which is the only daily newspaper serving Christian County. The State Journal-Register, published in Springfield, Illinois, covers Taylorville and Christian County quite extensively. The Decatur, Illinois Herald & Review covers the area as well.

Notable people 

 John J. Bullington - Illinois state representative, soldier, and politician; lived and practiced law in Taylorville
 Jon Corzine - 54th Governor of New Jersey 2006–2010; United States Senator representing New Jersey 2001–2006; previously co-CEO of Goldman Sachs, and CEO and Chairman of MF Global; born outside Taylorville and graduated from Taylorville High School 
 Yvonne Craig - actress who appeared in season 3 of the 1960s Batman TV series as Batgirl; born in Taylorville
 Rodney Davis - Congressman, raised in Taylorville and graduated from Taylorville High School
 James H. Forrester - Illinois state senator, judge, and lawyer; lived and practiced law in Taylorville
 Harry B. Hershey - Illinois Supreme Court justice; lived in and served as mayor of Taylorville
 Randy Hopper - Wisconsin State Senator; born in Taylorville
 Vern Mullen - professional football player
 Johnny Orr - basketball player and coach; born in Taylorville
 Pat Perry - former MLB pitcher for the St. Louis Cardinals and the Chicago Cubs; born in Taylorville
 Edward Mills Purcell - discovered nuclear magnetic resonance (MRI); winner of the Nobel Prize in Physics (1952); born in Taylorville
 James B. Ricks - Illinois Supreme Court justice; served as mayor of Taylorville
 Ruth Robertson - photojournalist; born in Taylorville
 Joyce Taylor - 1960s film and television actress; born in Taylorville
 Rolland F. Tipsword - Illinois state representative, judge, and lawyer; lived and practiced law in Taylorville
 Stuart J. Traynor - Illinois state legislator and lawyer, lived and practiced law in Taylorville.
 Clifford J. Vogelsang - Illinois state senator, judge, and lawyer; lived and practiced law in Taylorville

References

External links

 Taylorville city website
 Taylorville Schools
 Lincoln Land Community College-Taylorville
 Taylorville Park District
 Taylorville Chamber of Commerce
 Taylorville Main Street

Cities in Christian County, Illinois
Cities in Illinois
Micropolitan areas of Illinois
County seats in Illinois